The men's competition in the bantamweight (– 56 kg) division was held on 17 and 18 September 2010.

Schedule

Medalists

Records

Results

References
Pages 32–33 

- Mens 56 kg, 2010 World Weightlifting Championships